Mary Ann Recknall McCarthy (11 August 1866 – 13 October 1933) was a New Zealand teacher, temperance worker and political activist. She was born in Dunedin, New Zealand, on 11 August 1866.

References

1866 births
1933 deaths
Schoolteachers from Dunedin
New Zealand women activists
New Zealand temperance activists
New Zealand Labour Party politicians